Liverpool is a city and port in Merseyside, England, which contains many listed buildings.  A listed building is a structure designated by English Heritage of being of architectural and/or of historical importance and, as such, is included in the National Heritage List for England.  There are three grades of listing, according to the degree of importance of the structure.  Grade I includes those buildings that are of "exceptional interest, sometimes considered to be internationally important"; the buildings in Grade II* are "particularly important buildings of more than special interest"; and those in Grade II are "nationally important and of special interest".  Very few buildings are included in Grade I — only 2.5% of the total.  Grade II* buildings represent 5.5% of the total, while the great majority, 92%, are included in Grade II.

Liverpool contains more than 1,550 listed buildings, of which 28 are in Grade I, 109 in Grade II*, and the rest in Grade II.  This list contains the Grade II listed buildings in the L25 postal district of Liverpool.  The district includes the former villages of Woolton and Gateacre, which were later incorporated into the growing city of Liverpool.  It also contains the newer districts of Belle Vale and Hunt's Cross.  The listed buildings reflect this history.  They include such village features as crosses and memorials.  The houses vary from small old cottages and houses, to mansions built by wealthy businessmen during the 19th century.

Grade II listed buildings from other areas in the city can be found through the box on the right, along with the lists of the Grade I and Grade II* buildings in the city.

Buildings
{|style="width:100%;border:0px;text-align:left;line-height:150%;"
|-valign="top"
|

See also

Architecture of Liverpool

References and notes
Notes

Citations

Sources

External links
 Liverpool City Council listed buildings information page

Buildings in Liverpool 25
Listed buildings in Liverpool 25
Liverpool-related lists